WRRK (96.9 FM, "96.9 BOB-FM") is a variety hits radio station licensed to Braddock, Pennsylvania, serving Pittsburgh, Pennsylvania and owned by Saul Frischling, through licensee WPNT Media Subsidiary, LLC. Its studios are located at 5000 McKnight Road (Suite 401) in Pittsburgh's North Hills, and the transmitter tower is in the city's Hazelwood neighborhood.

History

WRRK was previously the call sign of a top 40/rock station in Manistee, Michigan.

This station was first issued a construction permit to Matta Broadcasting Company, which owned an AM station known then as WLOA (now WZUM), also licensed to Braddock.  Matta Broadcasting first applied for the frequency in November 1957, and was granted the permit in February 1958.  Studios were co-located with the AM station at 1233 Braddock Avenue in Braddock, with the station signing on as WLOA-FM on June 1, 1959.  Transmitter facilities were located on a hill just northeast of Braddock.

As WLOA was a daytime-only station at the time, its new FM sister provided nighttime radio service after the AM was required to sign off at local sunset, with simulcast portions of the broadcast day, with formats varying between easy listening and adult contemporary.

Station co-founder William G. Matta died in 1972, with the station being transferred from his estate to William J. Matta and Mrs. E.R. Matta in 1973.  William J. Matta took sole ownership of the station in 1975. After this transfer was completed, the station underwent a format change in 1977 to a hybrid of Top 40 and adult contemporary music, and a call letter change to WFFM, adopting the moniker "FM 97".  In 1979, the station modified its call letters to WFFM-FM (as its AM sister adopted those same calls), and then reverted to WFFM again in May 1981, receiving permission from the FCC five months later to dually identify its community of license as "Braddock-Pittsburgh".

In May 1982, Matta Broadcasting Company sold sister AM station WCKG and WFFM to Benns Communications.

In 1985, the station, by this time known as WHYW (since 1982), began featuring classic rock from 7 pm to midnight while retaining the soft rock format from 5 am to 7 pm and playing jazz overnight. They maintained their "Y-97 FM" identity during this time.  In March 1986 the station went to classic rock full-time; the calls were changed to WMYG and they began referring to themselves as "Magic Y-97 FM," shortening it to simply "Magic 97 FM" later that same year.  In 1991, the station switched to a current-based rock format, and the calls were changed to WRRK.  When the station was bought by Legend Communications in 1993, the classic rock format was resurrected, but the station retained the WRRK call letters. The format lasted for 13 years, as "Channel 97" and "97 RRK".

On November 1, 2005, WRRK flipped to adult hits as 96.9 Bob FM..

HD Radio 
WRRK broadcasts in HD Radio. Its subchannels previously featured spin-offs of the main format, with HD2 carrying "Bob's B-Sides", HD3 carrying "Bob's Malt Shop" (an oldies format focusing on music from the 1950s and 1960s), and HD4 carrying "Stay Tuned" (featuring television and movie theme music).

On February 11, 2022, WRRK-HD2 flipped to sports talk as Bet Sports Radio, carrying programming from the Vegas Stats & Information Network (VSiN).

References

External links
FCC History Cards - WFFM
WRRK official website

RRK
Bob FM stations
Adult hits radio stations in the United States
Radio stations established in 1959